Dmitri Shostakovich's String Quartet No. 4 in D major, Op. 83, was composed in 1949. It was premiered in Moscow in 1953 and is dedicated to the memory of Pyotr Vilyams (1902–1947), the artist and set designer.

It has four movements:

Playing time is approximately 25 minutes.

This string quartet is notable for the second movement's sustained, passionate first violin part, which rises to ecstatic heights, and also for the suspenseful and complex last movement.

The quartet is based on Jewish themes.

External links
 Shostakovich: the string quartets

04
1949 compositions
Compositions in D major